Marek Krajčí (born 24 March 1974) is a Slovak politician, former minister of health of Slovakia. Amidst pressure from the public and rival political parties on 11 March 2021 Krajčí announced his intentions to resign in the following weeks. He was a deputy in the National Council from 2016 to 2020 for the Ordinary People party. Following his resignation, he returned to the parliament

References

Living people
Members of the National Council (Slovakia) 2016-2020
Members of the National Council (Slovakia) 2020-present
OĽaNO politicians
Health ministers of Slovakia
1974 births